Dayne Maynard (born 1 April 1969) is a Barbadian cricketer. He played in sixteen first-class and ten List A matches for the Barbados cricket team from 1993 to 2001.

See also
 List of Barbadian representative cricketers

References

External links
 

1969 births
Living people
Barbadian cricketers
Barbados cricketers